Mouna Daaham is a 1990 Indian Malayalam film,  directed by K. Radhakrishnan.  The film has musical score by S. P. Venkatesh. It was awarded an A (restricted to adults) certificate by the censor board.

Cast
Harish Kumar
Kalaiselvi
Prathapachandran
Nizhalgal Ravi
Syamala

Soundtrack
The music was composed by Sangeetharajan and the lyrics were written by Poovachal Khader.

References

External links
 

1990 films
1990s Malayalam-language films